The Minister of Justice, Prisons Affairs and Constitutional Reforms is an appointment in the Cabinet of Sri Lanka.

The constitution defines that it is mandatory for a minister of the cabinet to be styled as the Minister of Justice. From 1947 to 1970, per section 48 of the constitution, the Minister of Justice was one of two Ministers appointed from the Senate of Ceylon, as such appointments have been held by Advocates. It succeeded the office of Legal Secretary of Ceylon which existed from 1932 to 1947.

List of Justice Ministers
Parties

See also
 Ministry of Justice, Prisons Affairs and Constitutional Reforms

References

External links
 Ministry of Justice, Prisons Affairs and Constitutional Reforms
 Government of Sri Lanka

 
Justice